In Greek mythology, Labdacus  (Lábdakos) was the only son of Polydorus and a king of Thebes. Labdacus was a grandson of Thebes' founder, Cadmus. His mother was Nycteïs, daughter of Nycteus.

Mythology 
Polydorus died while Labdacus was a young child, leaving Nycteus as his regent, although Lycus soon replaced him in that office. When Labdacus had grown, he ruled Thebes for a short time. He died while he was still young, after he lost a war with the king of Athens, Pandion, over their borders. Apollodorus writes that he, like his cousin Pentheus, was ripped apart by women in a bacchic frenzy for disrespect to the god Dionysus. Lycus became regent once more after his death, this time for Labdacus' son, Laius. His descendants were called the Labdacids, and included his son Laius, who fathered Oedipus; Oedipus' children were Polynices, Eteocles, Antigone, and Ismene.

Family tree of Theban Royal House

Notes

References 

 Apollodorus, The Library with an English Translation by Sir James George Frazer, F.B.A., F.R.S. in 2 Volumes, Cambridge, MA, Harvard University Press; London, William Heinemann Ltd. 1921. ISBN 0-674-99135-4. Online version at the Perseus Digital Library. Greek text available from the same website.
 Pausanias, Description of Greece with an English Translation by W.H.S. Jones, Litt.D., and H.A. Ormerod, M.A., in 4 Volumes. Cambridge, MA, Harvard University Press; London, William Heinemann Ltd. 1918. . Online version at the Perseus Digital Library
 Pausanias, Graeciae Descriptio. 3 vols. Leipzig, Teubner. 1903.  Greek text available at the Perseus Digital Library.

Theban kings
Kings in Greek mythology
Theban characters in Greek mythology